Albert von Kersten (1889–1937) was an Austrian stage and film actor.

Selected filmography
 Serge Panine (1922)
 Fatme's Rescue (1922)
 Gypsy Love (1922)
 William Ratcliff (1922)
 The Hell of Barballo (1923)
 Miss Madame (1923)
 Children of the Revolution (1923)
 Colonel Redl (1925)
 The Arsonists of Europe (1926)
 Two and a Lady (1926)
 Café Elektric (1927)
 Tales from the Vienna Woods (1928)
 The Fate of the House of Habsburg (1928)
 Endangered Girls (1928)
 The Missing Wife (1929)
 Madame Bluebeard (1931)
 Grandstand for General Staff (1932)
 When Love Sets the Fashion (1932)
 Quick (1932)
 Song of the Black Mountains (1933)
 I Was Jack Mortimer (1935)
 Artist Love (1935)
 My Life for Maria Isabella (1935)

References

Bibliography
 Giesen, Rolf. Nazi Propaganda Films: A History and Filmography. McFarland, 2003.

External links

1889 births
1937 deaths
Austrian male film actors
Austrian male silent film actors
20th-century Austrian male actors
Austrian male stage actors
People from Rijeka
Actors from Rijeka